The 2014 MBC Drama Awards is a ceremony honoring the outstanding achievement in television on the Munhwa Broadcasting Corporation (MBC) network for the year of 2014. It was held on December 30, 2014 and hosted by Shin Dong-yup and Girls' Generation's Choi Soo-young.

Nominations and winners
Winners denoted in bold
The Grand Prize (Daesang) has been determined through viewer's votes since 2014, and not by a professional set of judges.

References

External links
http://www.imbc.com/broad/tv/ent/event/2014mbc/

MBC Drama Awards
MBC Drama Awards
MBC Drama Awards